Drosera andersoniana, the sturdy sundew, is an erect perennial tuberous species in the genus Drosera that is endemic to Western Australia. Its pink-white to red flowers emerge from August to September. D. andersoniana grows in loamy soils near granite outcrops.

D. andersoniana was first described and named by William Vincent Fitzgerald but was first validly published by Alfred James Ewart and Jean White-Haney in 1909.

See also 
List of Drosera species

References 

andersoniana
Carnivorous plants of Australia
Caryophyllales of Australia
Eudicots of Western Australia
Plants described in 1909